James Burke was a professional baseball player who played pitcher in the Major Leagues from 1882 to 1884. He played for the Buffalo Bisons and Boston Reds.

External links

Major League Baseball pitchers
Boston Reds (UA) players
Buffalo Bisons (NL) players
19th-century baseball players
Jersey City Skeeters players
Meriden Maroons players
Date of birth missing
Date of death missing